USS Chingachgook (SP-35) was a motorboat acquired by the United States Navy during World War I. She was outfitted as an armed patrol craft for the 3d Naval District and assigned to patrol New York City waterways. Unfortunately, after several months of operation by the Navy, an on-board gasoline explosion destroyed the craft.

A fast motorboat for the era
Chingachgook – a  fast motorboat – was built in 1916 by the Greenport Basin and Construction Company of Greenport, Long Island, New York.

World War I service
Her owner – T. W. Brigham of Greenport – had her armed as a patrol craft as part of the preparedness movement then active in the United States.

She was acquired by the Navy for World War I service in May 1917, and on 6 June 1917 she was placed in commission as USS Chingachgook (SP-35), named after James Fenimore Cooper's Last of the Mohicans character, and assigned to the 3d Naval District for patrol duty.

The boat briefly performed patrol service in the New York City area, but on 31 July 1917 her gasoline tank exploded, injuring members of the crew and igniting the ship. A survey of 13 October found her hull worthless and beyond repair.

Decommissioning and disposal
Decommissioned at the beginning of October, her remains were disposed of by burning on 19 February 1918.

References

Chingachgook (American Motor Boat, 1916). Served as USS Chingachgook (SP-35) in 1917
NavSource Online: Chingachgook (SP 35)

World War I patrol vessels of the United States
Motorboats of the United States Navy
Ships built in Greenport, New York
1916 ships
Maritime incidents in 1917
Ship fires